Decadência is a 1995 Brazilian miniseries produced and displayed by Rede Globo between September 5 and September 22, 1995, in a total of 12 chapters.

Written by Dias Gomes, it was freely inspired by a novel of the author himself, it counted in general direction and supervision of Roberto Farias and Ignácio Coqueiro.

The main characters are played by Edson Celulari and Adriana Esteves.

Plot 
The miniseries shows the decline of a conservative and once-powerful Carioca family, the Tavares Branco, in the period from 1984 to 1992. Following the death of Tancredo Neves to the election and downfall of President Fernando Collor, the Tavares Branco are failing and revealing their moral and financial problems.

The plot begins in 1970 with the judge Tavares Branco accepting a priest's request to raise an orphan boy, Mariel, who stays under the care of maid Jandira. Mariel grows and becomes the family driver, but ends up getting involved with Carla, the youngest of the house, and is expelled from the mansion, accused of rape.

Time passes, and Mariel finds Jandira, who has always had a love for the former driver. She takes him to a cult in a Neo-Pentecostalism church, and Mariel finds salvation in her church for his problems. Five years later, he becomes a millionaire after founding his own church, the Temple of the Divine Flame, while his former masters impoverish. But the same feelings of the past continue to connect Mariel's new life to the universe of the Tavares Branco: the passion for Carla and the desire for revenge.

Although they love each other, Mariel and Carla have different ideals of life: he intends to grow more and more with their churches, and she, quite politicized, elect of the PT, does not agree with her unethical way of acting.

Cast 

Special participation

Introducing

Guest actors

Repercussion 
Decadência caused a great controversy with a religious preaching of Mariel, character of Edson Celulari, who found a quote from the spiritual leader of the Universal Church of the Kingdom of God, Bishop Edir Macedo.

The miniseries provoked a revolt of the spiritual leader. At the time of its screening, in September 1995, a Rede Globo was in "war" with a Church, having shown several reports against the leader of the church weeks before the miniseries debut. How strong scenes of the miniseries were considered as a provocation and a blasphemy to the evangelical faith. In an episode of the miniseries, during a sex scene, a bra was thrown over the Bible.

References

External links 
 

Brazilian television miniseries
TV Globo telenovelas
1995 Brazilian television series debuts
1995 Brazilian television series endings